Parsauni  is a village development committee in Nawalparasi District in the Lumbini Zone of southern Nepal. At the time of the 2001 Nepal census it had a population of 6000 people living in 850 individual households.

References

Populated places in Nawalpur District